Falling into Place is a studio album by Mike Viola and the Candy Butchers released in 1999.

Track listing
(All songs written by Mike Viola.)
 "Falling Into Place" - 2:58
 "Killing Floor" - 4:05
 "All I Have" - 2:17
 "Too Much Going On" - 3:36
 "Let It Ride" - 2:49
 "Give Me Some Time" - 4:01
 "Hills Of L.A." - 3:07
 "I Don't Know Anything" - 2:37
 "Can't We Do Anything Right" - 2:28
 "Stop When It Hurts" - 2:56
 "Doing It The Wrong Way" - 2:26
 "Break Your Heart" - 3:28
 "Fall Back Down" - 2:55
 "Once I Was" - 5:10

Personnel
Danny Bennett: producer
Dae Bennett: producer
Mike Viola: vocals, guitars, producer
Pete Donnelly: bass, vocals
Mike Levesque: drums
Dan Levine: trombone (on "Once I Was")
Larry Etkin: trumpet (on "Once I Was")
Jim O'Connor: trumpet (on "Once I Was")
Garth Hudson: saxophone, keyboards (on "Once I Was")

References

1999 albums
Mike Viola albums